Robbie S. Nichols (born August 4, 1964) is a Canadian former professional ice hockey player who played in the American Hockey League (AHL) and International Hockey League (IHL).

Career 
Nichols was drafted by the Philadelphia Flyers in the ninth round of the 1983 NHL Entry Draft. He played nine seasons in the AHL and IHL, winning a Calder Cup with the Adirondack Red Wings in 1989. 

Nichols later became a head coach following his playing career, serving seven seasons as the head coach of the Flint Generals. Nichols also worked as the general manager of the ECHL's Elmira Jackals from 2007 to 2013. He is the owner of the Elmira Enforcers Federal Hockey League team and a co-owner of the Elmira Pioneers amateur baseball team. In 2019, at the age of 55, Nichols was an emergency player for his Enforcers' team during a game.

Career statistics

Awards and honours

References

External links

1964 births
Adirondack Red Wings players
Canadian ice hockey coaches
Canadian ice hockey right wingers
Detroit Falcons (CoHL) players
Flint Generals players
Fredericton Express players
Ice hockey people from Ontario
Kalamazoo Wings (1974–2000) players
Kitchener Rangers players
Living people
North Bay Centennials players
Philadelphia Flyers draft picks
Phoenix Roadrunners (IHL) players
San Diego Gulls (IHL) players
Sportspeople from Hamilton, Ontario
San Diego Barracudas players